The 1992–93 Ekstraklasa (then known as I liga) was the 58th season of the highest tier domestic division in the Polish football league system since its establishment in 1927.

It was contested by 18 teams. Siarka Tarnobrzeg made their first Ekstraklasa appearance in the club's history.

Lech Poznań successfully defended their title after two final day games (Wisła Kraków vs Legia Warsaw 0–6; ŁKS Łódź vs Olimpia Poznań 7–1) had been cancelled due to allegations of "unsportsmanlike conduct during the game". Known colloquially as "The Sunday of Miracles", UEFA subsequently disqualified Polish clubs from the UEFA Cup competitions.

League table

Results

Top goalscorers

References

External links
 Poland – List of final tables at RSSSF 

Ekstraklasa seasons
1992–93 in Polish football
Pol